Gerolamo Maria Caracciolo,  Marqués de Torrecuso was a Spanish aristocrat and soldier born in the Kingdom of Naples in the 17th century. He rose through the ranks of the Spanish army becoming Governor of Navarre and saw extensive service during the Thirty Years War and the Catalan Revolt.
His military career ended shortly after his defeat at the battle of Montijo (1644).

Marquesses of Spain
Spanish soldiers
17th-century Spanish people
People from Campagna
Grandees of Spain